The dwarf smooth-hound (Mustelus minicanis) is a houndshark of the family Triakidae. It is found on the continental shelves of the tropical western central Atlantic, off the coast of South America between Cabo de la Vela, Colombia and Rio Caribe, Venezuela, at depths between 70 and 180 m. It can grow up to a length of 48 cm. The reproduction of dwarf smooth-hounds is ovoviviparous.

References

 

dwarf smooth-hound
Fish of Colombia
Fish of Venezuela
dwarf smooth-hound